Al Kharma' is a village in Al Madinah Province, in western Saudi Arabia.

See also 

 List of cities and towns in Saudi Arabia
 Regions of Saudi Arabia

References

Populated places in Medina Province (Saudi Arabia)